Aaron Tran (born July 24, 1996) is an American short track speed skater. He competed in the 2018 Winter Olympics.

References

1996 births
Living people
American male short track speed skaters
American sportspeople of Vietnamese descent
Competitors at the 2015 Winter Universiade
Four Continents Short Track Speed Skating Championships medalists
Olympic short track speed skaters of the United States
People from Federal Way, Washington
Short track speed skaters at the 2018 Winter Olympics